Tauriers is a commune in the Ardèche department in southern France.

Its inhabitants are called Taurierois (male) and Taurieroises (female).

History
 1790 : Tauriers was detached from Chassiers.
 1 December 1974 : Tauriers attached to Largentière.
 1 January 1989 : Tauriers was re-established as an independent commune.

Population

People linked to the commune 
 Michel Sima (1912–1987), Polish sculptor, photographer and ceramicist best known for his photographic portraits of Picasso and of almost all the artists of the School of Paris, lived and died in Tauriers.
 Werner Reinisch (1930), painter, engraver.
 Françoise Dasque (1960), actress. Walked between 2010 and 2012 from Tauriers to China and Japan.
 Louis-Gabriel Suchet, Duke of Albufera, (1770–1826), Marshal of the Empire, Pair de France, French soldier during Revolution and the Empire.

See also
 Communes of the Ardèche department

References

Communes of Ardèche